Hopârta is a commune located in Alba County, Transylvania, Romania. It has a population of 1,152 (2011). It is composed of five villages: Hopârta, Silivaș (Mikószilvás), Șpălnaca (Ispánlaka), Turdaș (Oláhtordos), and Vama Seacă (Szárazvámtanya).

Geography
The commune is situated on the Transylvanian Plateau, in the northeastern corner of the county. The river Fărău flows north through Vama Seacă, discharging into the Mureș near Noșlac. 

Hopârta has the following neighbors: the town of Ocna Mureș to the west and northwest, Noșlac commune to the northeast, Fărău and Șona communes to the east, and Lopadea Nouă commune to the south and southeast. It is traversed by county road DJ107E, which connects the city of Aiud,  to the west, to Vama Seacă, and then on via DJ107D, to Ocna Mureș. is traversed by county road DJ107E, which connects the city of Aiud,  to the west, to Vama Seacă, and then on via DJ107D, to Ocna Mureș.

Dacian bracelets from Șpălnaca

A trove of Dacian bracelets dating from the Bronze Age IV and Iron Age I (10th–9th centuries BC) have been discovered at Șpălnaca. The bracelets have decorations of geometric characters of chiseled or engraved lines.

Natives
Ioan Andone (born 1960), footballer
 (1918–1977), veterinarian, corresponding member of the Romanian Academy

References

External links

Communes in Alba County
Localities in Transylvania